A blini (sometimes spelled bliny) ( pl., diminutive: блинчики, blinchiki, dialectal, diminutive: млинчики, mlynchiki) or, sometimes, blin (more accurate as a single form of the noun), is a Russian and more broadly Eastern European pancake traditionally made from  buckwheat flour or nowadays wheat and served with smetana, tvorog, butter, caviar and other garnishes. Blini are among the most popular and most-eaten dishes in Russia.

In the West, blini traditionally refers to small (2-4 inches in diameter) savory pancakes made with leavened batter. In modern Russian, the term most often refers to pan-sized leavened thin pancakes, although smaller leavened pancakes are also called blini and were much more common historically.

Some English dictionaries record usage of the forms blin as singular and blini or bliny as plural, which corresponds to the original Russian forms, but other dictionaries consider this usage so rare in English that they do not mention blin at all and only record the widespread modern regular usage of blini for the singular and blinis for the plural. Some cookbooks and restaurants use blin and blintchick as in Russian to refer to crêpes.

Blintzes are an offshoot (an evolved or variant form) of blini. They are thin pancakes usually made of wheat flour (not buckwheat), folded to form a casing (as for cheese or fruit), and then sautéed or baked.

Etymology

The Old Slavic term for the Russian pancakes was probably mlinŭ, which transformed in Old Russian into , (cf. ’, Ukrainian for blin). While the Russian word   (plural of  ) refers in modern Russian also to the introduced foreign pancakes in general; meanwhile the term   (Russian pancakes) is often emphasized in Russia for differentiation.

Usage in modern Russian
Aside from referring to pancakes, the word  is used as a linguistic signal in communications. It is used when a person talks to others and is searching for the right words or to express their dissatisfaction as a euphemism for "damn."

History

Blini were considered by early East Slavic people in pre-Christian times to be a symbol of the sun due to their round form. They were traditionally prepared at the end of winter to honor the rebirth of the new sun (Butter Week, or Maslenitsa, also called "pancake week"). The tradition of a dairy festival at that time of year was adopted by the Orthodox church as a way of using up dairy products before the start of Great Lent. This tradition is observed by Western Christians as Pancake Day. Drochena, a kind of blini, was also served at wakes to commemorate the recently deceased.

Traditional Russian blini are made with yeasted batter, which is left to rise and then diluted with milk, soured milk, and cold or boiling water. When diluted with boiling water, they are referred to as zavarniye bliny. A lighter and thinner form made from unyeasted batter (usually made of flour, eggs, milk, or soured milk, kefir, ryazhenka, varenets) is also common in Russia. Traditionally, blini are baked in a Russian oven. The process of preparing blini is still referred to as baking in Russian, even though they are nowadays pan-fried, like pancakes. All kinds of flour may be used, from wheat and buckwheat to oatmeal and millet, although wheat is currently the most popular.

Jewish version

A somewhat similar Jewish dish exists and is a very popular traditional Ashkenazi Jewish dish called blintz. Blintzes were popularized in the United States by Eastern European Jewish immigrants. Blintzes are a very important part of Jewish cuisine in some regions. They are traditionally served for several holidays in Judaism, such as Shavuot. Blintzes stuffed with a cheese filling and then fried in oil are served on holidays such as Hanukkah (as oil played a pivotal role in the miracle of the Hanukkah story) and Shavuot (when dairy dishes are traditionally served within the Ashkenazi minhag). Blini and blinchiki are ordinarily stuffed before being fried a second time, wrapped around a stuffing and eaten without refrying, or folded and eaten with a dip. Fillings include chocolate, mushrooms, meat, rice, mashed potatoes, and cheese.

Varieties

Some ways that blini are prepared and served include the following:
 Blini made from batter containing various additions such as grated potato or apple and raisins. Such blini are quite common in Eastern Europe and are more solidly filled than the spongy pancakes usually eaten in North America.
 Blini covered with butter, sour cream, varenie or jam, honey or caviar (whitefish, salmon or traditional sturgeon).

They may be folded or rolled into a tube with sweet or salty fillings such as varenye, fruit, berry, mashed potatoes, tvorog, cooked ground meat, cooked chicken, salmon, chopped boiled eggs with green onions or chopped mushrooms.

 Blini made by pouring batter over chopped vegetables, meat, or mushrooms put on a frying pan beforehand are called "blini s pripyokom."
 Blintzes. A filling such as varenie, fruit, potato, quark, cottage cheese or farmer cheese, cooked ground meat, cooked chicken and even chopped mushrooms, bean sprouts, cabbage and onions (for a Chinese spring roll-type blintz) is rolled or enveloped into a pre-fried blintz. Then the blintz is lightly re-fried, sautéed or baked. Such blintzes are also called nalysnyky. Caviar is a popular filling during Russian-style cocktail parties.
 Buckwheat blini are part of traditional Russian cuisine.

Blini are considered to be the traditional meal in Lithuanian culture on Shrove Tuesday.

See also

References

Jewish baked goods
Ashkenazi Jewish cuisine
Belarusian cuisine
German desserts
Lithuanian cuisine
Carnival foods
Pancakes
Russian desserts
Shavuot
Slavic cuisine
Ukrainian desserts
Ukrainian cuisine
Stuffed dishes
Lithuanian desserts
Soviet cuisine
Street food in Russia